The 2021 Pan American Taekwondo Championships, the 21st edition of the Pan American Taekwondo Championships, was held in Cancún, Mexico from 3 to 4 June 2021.

Medal summary

Men

Women

Medal table

References

External links 

World Taekwondo

Pan American Taekwondo Championships
Pan American Championships
International sports competitions hosted by Mexico
Pan American Taekwondo Championships
Pan American Taekwondo Championships